Anglesea may refer to:

Places
 Anglesea (modern spelling Anglesey), an island off the northwest coast of Wales
Anglesea, New Jersey, an unincorporated community in the US
Anglesea Borough, New Jersey, former borough, currently part of North Wildwood, New Jersey, US
Anglesea, Victoria, an Australian town

People
Pete Anglesea (born 1971), English rugby union player

Ships
 HMS Anglesea, multiple ships of the Royal Navy
 Marquis of Anglesea (1815 ship), wrecked in 1829

Sports
 Anglesea Football Club, an Australian rules football club in the Australian state of Victoria
 Anglesea Road Cricket Ground, in Dublin, Ireland

Other
 Anglesea (EP), a 2011 EP by King Gizzard & the Lizard Wizard
 Anglesea Barracks, in central Hobart, Tasmania
 Anglesea Heath, in the Australian state of Victoria
 Anglesea River, in the Australian state of Victoria
 Anglesea Road, in Dublin, Ireland

See also

Anglesey (disambiguation)